Apel·les Mestres i Oñós (28 October 1854, Barcelona - 19 July 1936, Barcelona) was a Catalan writer, graphic artist, and illustrator.

Biography 
His father, was an architect who participated in numerous major project, including the demolition of the city walls. He attended a French secondary school, and studied at the Escola de la Llotja, where he showed a talent for caricatures. His teachers included Antoni Caba, Lluís Rigalt, Claudi Lorenzale and Ramon Martí Alsina.

He made several extended visits to Switzerland with his friend, the journalist and playwright, where he was influenced by Swiss federalism, the poetry of Heinrich Heine, and the comic drawings of Rodolphe Töpffer. He would later work for some of the most important magazines of that time; contributing comics, jokes, and headline designs. 

In 1885, he married Laura Radénez, a Parisian with some artistic talent. They had no children. Their home, a narrow apartment in the old part of town, with a garden of hydrangeas on the roof, became a meeting place for the creative community of Barcelona.

He considered books to be a global art form, and was involved in every step of the process; including the paper, the cover and the binding. In 1912, he had to abandon drawing, due to a visual impairment. Two years later, he had become almost blind. He continued his creative activities however; improvising songs on the piano, then having them harmonized and written down by professional musicians. His songs have been recorded by many notable performers, including Conchita Badía.

In 1915, he wrote a book of poems about World War I, Flors de Sang (Flowers of Blood), which gained him several awards, including a Cross of the Legion of Honor, from the French government. Later, these poems would become very popular with Republican forces during the Spanish Civil War. He died shortly after it had begun.

In 1938, a marble monument was dedicated to him, in a park at the foot of Tibidabo. A literary prize for illustrated children's books bears his name.

Sources 
 Joan Armangué i Herrero, Obra primerenca d'Apel·les Mestres (1872-1886), Ed. Abadia de Montserrat, 2007 
 Josep Maria Ainaud de Lasarte (Ed.), Apel·les Mestres (1854-1936). En el cinquantenari de la seva mort. 1936-1986, Fundació Jaume I, 1985
 Mateu Avellaneda and Joana Escobedo (Eds.), La meva col·lecció Apel·les Mestres, Biblioteca de Catalunya, 2005

External links 

 Personal papers and documents @ the Arxiu Històric de la Ciutat de Barcelona
 Collection of manuscripts @ the Biblioteca de Catalunya
 Biography, works and other topics @ the Associació d'Escriptors en Llengua Catalana

1854 births
1936 deaths
Artists from Catalonia
Spanish illustrators
Spanish cartoonists
Writers from Barcelona
Poets from Catalonia